= S. G. Grubb =

American politician

Member of the Washington House of Representatives
- In office 1889–1891

Personal details
- Born: October 4, 1834 Meadville, Pennsylvania, United States
- Died: July 30, 1908 (aged 73) Tacoma, Washington, United States
- Party: Republican

Stephen G. Grubb (October 4, 1834 – July 30, 1908) was an American politician in the state of Washington. He served in the Washington House of Representatives from 1889 to 1891.
